Abdul Bari Sarkar is a politician from Kurigram district of Bangladesh and a former Member of Parliament for Kurigram-4 constituency.

Career 
Sarkar is the president of Chilmari Upazila BNP. He was elected to parliament from Kurigram-4 as a Bangladesh Nationalist Party candidate in 15 February 1996 Bangladeshi general election. He was defeated in the 7th Jatiya Sangsad elections on 12 June 1996 as a candidate of Bangladesh Nationalist Party from Kurigram-4 constituency.

References 

Living people
Year of birth missing (living people)
People from Kurigram District
Bangladesh Nationalist Party politicians
6th Jatiya Sangsad members